Devta may refer to:

Devta (novel), an Urdu serialized fantasy thriller novel
Devta (1956 film), a 1956 Hindi partly coloured swashbuckler film
Devta (1983 film), a 1983 Marathi Indian film
Devta (1998 film), a 1998 Hindi-language Indian feature film

See also
Devata, concept of deity in Indian religions.